Cole Slaw is an album by jazz saxophonist Lou Donaldson recorded for the Argo label in 1964 and performed by Donaldson with pianist Herman Foster, bassist Earl May, drummer Bruno Carr, and congalero Ray Barretto.

The album was awarded 3 stars in an Allmusic review.

Track listing 
All compositions by Lou Donaldson except as indicated
 "There Is No Greater Love" (Isham Jones, Marty Symes)
 "Poinciana" (Nat Simon, Buddy Bernier)
 "Cole Slaw" (aka "Sorghum Switch") (Jesse Stone)
 "People Will Say We're in Love" (Richard Rodgers, Oscar Hammerstein II)
 "Li'l Miss Fine" 
 "'O Sole Mio" (Eduardo Di Capua, Alfredo Mazzucchi, Giovanni Capurro)
 "Skylark" (Hoagy Carmichael, Johnny Mercer)                
 "Soul Gumbo"                 
     
 Recorded in NYC on June 19, 1964.

Personnel 
 Lou Donaldson - alto saxophone
 Herman Foster - piano
 Earl May - bass
 Bruno Carr - drums
 Ray Barretto - congas

References 

Lou Donaldson albums
1964 albums
Argo Records albums
Albums produced by Esmond Edwards